Dehousse is a surname. Notable people with the surname include:

Fernand Dehousse (1906–1976), Belgian politician
Jean-Maurice Dehousse (born 1936), former Member of the European Parliament and first Minister-President of the Walloon Region
Renaud Dehousse, Belgian lawyer and professor